Journal of the History of the Neurosciences is a British academic journal founded in 1992. It covers the history of neuroscience. The journal contains a combination of original articles, book reviews, and two unique types of columns called "NEUROwords" and the "Neurognostics" Questions and Answers.

References

External links
 International Society for the History of the Neurosciences

Publications established in 1992
History of medicine journals
Neurology journals
Neuroscience journals
Quarterly journals